Aharon Danziger is an Israeli volleyball player, who competed for Israel in men's standing volleyball at the 1976 Summer Paralympics, the 1980 Summer Paralympics, the 1984 Summer Paralympics, and the 1992 Summer Paralympics. As a member of the Israeli team, he won gold medals in 1976, 1980, and 1984.

He also competed in men's para athletics and para swimming events at the 1976 Summer Paralympics, winning a gold medal in the men's 100 m C event, finishing 5th in the high jump C event, 7th in the 100 m breaststroke C event, 13th in the javelin throw C event, and 14th in long jump C event. At the 1980 Summer Paralympics, he competed the men's 100 m C event but did not reach the final round.

See also 
 Israel at the 1976 Summer Paralympics
 Israel at the 1980 Summer Paralympics
 Israel at the 1984 Summer Paralympics
 Israel at the 1992 Summer Paralympics

References

External links 
 Aharon Danziger at World ParaVolley

Living people
Year of birth missing (living people)
Place of birth missing (living people)
Israeli male athletes
Israeli male swimmers
Israeli men's volleyball players
Paralympic athletes of Israel
Paralympic swimmers of Israel
Paralympic volleyball players of Israel
Paralympic gold medalists for Israel
Paralympic medalists in athletics (track and field)
Paralympic medalists in volleyball
Athletes (track and field) at the 1976 Summer Paralympics
Swimmers at the 1976 Summer Paralympics
Volleyball players at the 1976 Summer Paralympics
Athletes (track and field) at the 1980 Summer Paralympics
Volleyball players at the 1980 Summer Paralympics
Volleyball players at the 1984 Summer Paralympics
Volleyball players at the 1992 Summer Paralympics
Medalists at the 1976 Summer Paralympics
Medalists at the 1980 Summer Paralympics
Medalists at the 1984 Summer Paralympics